A leaf blower, commonly known as a blower, is a device that propels air out of a nozzle to move debris such as leaves and grass cuttings.  Leaf blowers are powered by electric or gasoline motors. Gasoline models have traditionally been two-stroke engines, but four-stroke engines were recently introduced to partially address air pollution concerns. Leaf blowers are typically self-contained handheld units, or backpack mounted units with a handheld wand. The latter is more ergonomic for prolonged use. Larger units may rest on wheels and even use a motor for propulsion. These are sometimes called "walk-behind leaf blowers" because they must be pushed by hand to be operated. Some units called blower vacs, can also suck in leaves and small twigs via a vacuum, and shred them into a bag.

Leaf blowers are a source of controversy due to their adverse impacts such as operator injury, including hearing loss, particulates air pollution, noise pollution, and ecological habitat destruction. Over 200 localities have restricted the use of leaf blowers and many major cities, including Washington, DC, are implementing total bans due to the negative effects to operator health, ecological destruction, pollution, and nuisances including noise. October 9, 2021, California passed an air pollution control law AB1346 phasing out small off-road engines, like those found in leaf blowers, set to take effect January 1, 2024.

History 

Leaf blowers were originally introduced in California. By 1990, annual sales were over 800,000 in the U.S., and the tool had become a ubiquitous gardening implement.

Other functions beyond the simple use of garden maintenance have been demonstrated by Richard Hammond on the Brainiac television series, in which a man-sized hovercraft was constructed from a leaf blower.

The leaf blower originated in 1947 as a backpack fogger apparatus, invented by Japanese-based Kyoritsu Noki Company.  Kyoritsu followed that design with a backpack/blower/misting machine in 1955.  in 1968, Kyoritsu applied for a patent on a backpack blower mister design, and in 1972 established themselves in the United States as Kioritz Corporation of America, and is said to have invented the first leaf blower in 1977. The company changed its name to  Echo in 1978.

Among such rival manufacturers as Stihl, Weed Eater, and Husqvarna, Echo saw the sales of leaf blowers in the 1970s explode.  It is estimated that the sale of leaf blowers in the U.S., had exceeded 1 million units by 1989.

To meet the 1995 California regulations for noise and air pollution, leaf blower manufacturers modified the current engine designs to comply. However, 1999 regulations were far more stringent, forcing the engineering of a quieter, more compliant 2-stroke engine design.  While leaf blowers were becoming more tolerable in U.S. suburban neighborhoods, many communities had by now, in fact, banned their use. In the mid-2000s and to further answer critics, manufacturers once again evolved the leaf blower, with the use of NICad (nickel-cadmium) powered tool design to create the first cordless leaf blower. The new NiCad battery-powered leaf blower designs were further improved by way of the more powerful, and longer run time lithium-ion batteries, which incorporate most cordless leaf blowers marketed today. Cordless leaf blowers today operate with zero emissions and operate at an estimated 70% noise reduction (compared to levels produced by their predecessors).

Environmental and occupational impact 

Emissions from gasoline-powered grounds-keeping equipment in general are a source of air pollution and more immediately, noise pollution. In the United States, US emission standards prescribe maximum emissions from small engines. The two-stroke engines used in most leaf blowers operate by mixing gasoline with oil, and a third of this mixture is not burned, but is emitted as an aerosol exhaust. These pollutants have been linked to cancer, heart disease, and asthma. A 2011 study found that the amount of NMHC pollutants emitted by a leaf blower operated for 30 minutes is comparable to the amount emitted by a Ford F-150 pickup truck driving from Texas to Alaska.

In addition to the adverse health effects of carbon monoxide, nitrogen oxides, hydrocarbons, and particulates generated in the exhaust gas of the gasoline-powered engines, leaf blowers pose problems related to the dust raised by the powerful flow of air. Dust clouds caused by leaf blowers contain potentially harmful substances such as pesticides, mold, and animal fecal matter that may cause irritation, allergies, and disease.

Noise pollution is also a concern with leaf blowers, as they can emit noise levels above those required to cause hearing loss to both the operator and those nearby.

Leaf blowers also present an occupational hearing hazard to the nearly 1 million people who work in lawn service and ground-keeping. A recent study assessed the occupational noise exposure among groundskeepers at several North Carolina public universities and found noise levels from leaf blowers averaging 89 decibels (A-weighted) and maximum sound pressure levels reaching 106 dB(A), both far exceeding the National Institute for Occupational Safety and Health (NIOSH) Recommended Exposure Limit of 85 dB(A)

Leaves are ecologically beneficial, providing habitat for insects and microorganisms and nutrients for the soil. Leaving some leaves rather than removing them all can support biodiversity.

Bans 
Soon after the leaf blower was introduced into the U.S., its use was banned in two California cities, Carmel-by-the-Sea in 1975 and Beverly Hills in 1978, as a noise nuisance. There are currently twenty California cities that have banned leaf blowers, sometimes only within residential neighborhoods and usually targeting gasoline-powered equipment. Another 80 cities have ordinances on the books restricting either usage or noise level or both.

Washington, DC, passed a ban on gas-power leaf blowers in 2018. A law banning the sale of gas-powered lawn equipment in California will take effect in 2024.

See also
 String trimmer

References

External links 
 
 

American inventions
Gardening tools
Leaves
Home appliances
20th-century inventions